Yr Elen is a mountain in the Carneddau range in Snowdonia, Wales. It is the ninth highest mountain in Snowdonia. It lies on a short ridge running north-northwest off the main northeast-to-southwest ridge of the Carneddau, just over one kilometre from Carnedd Llewelyn.

It is usually climbed from the main ridge of the Carneddau, as it is only a short walk from Carnedd Llywelyn. It can also be climbed from Gerlan, near Bethesda, following Afon Llafar then heading up the slopes of Yr Elen, but this involves walking through wet valleys and a number of rivers that are difficult to cross. In drier times, ascent can be made via the crossing of Afon Caseg and then up the "front edge" of the peak. The views from this point north-west, over to Bangor and Anglesey, are stunning on a clear day, especially with a summer's sunset. This is well worth the arduous ascent.

The etymology of the name is unclear, with the personal name "Helen" or "Eleanor" being one possibility, perhaps after  Eleanor de Montfort (d. 1282), Princess of Wales and wife of Llywelyn ap Gruffudd.  Another is the leech (from soft mutation of Welsh gelen, leech), perhaps in reference to the way in which Yr Elen appears to be attached to the side of the remaining Carneddau.

References

External links
 

Hewitts of Wales
Mountains and hills of Snowdonia
Nuttalls
Mountains and hills of Gwynedd
Furths
Llanllechid